Stenopygium is a genus of flies in the family Dolichopodidae. It contains two species which are found in the Neotropical realm, and is related to Pelastoneurus.

Species
Stenopygium nubeculum Becker, 1922
Stenopygium punctipennis (Say, 1829)

References

Dolichopodinae
Dolichopodidae genera
Taxa named by Theodor Becker
Diptera of North America
Diptera of South America